Huch or HUCH may refer to:

 Ricarda Huch (1864–1947), German intellectual
 8847 Huch, asteroid named after Ricarda Huch
 Helsinki University Central Hospital (HUCH)